Nordquist or Nordqvist is a surname of Swedish origin meaning "northern twig" and may refer to:

Nordquist
Doug Nordquist (born 1958), American high jumper
Helen Nordquist (born 1932),  All-American Girls Professional Baseball League player
Hilda Lovisa Nordquist (1881–1935), Swedish missionary
Jennifer Nordquist (born 1967), American official
Jeremy Nordquist, American politician and Nebraska state senator from Nebraska 
Jonas Nordquist (born 1982), Swedish ice hockey player
Mark Nordquist (born 1945), American football player

Nordqvist
Anna Nordqvist, Swedish golfer
Bertil Nordqvist, Swedish ski-orienteering competitor and world champion
Björn Nordqvist, Swedish former football defender 
Gustaf Nordqvist, Swedish composer 
Jens Nordqvist, Swedish sprint canoer
Kew Nordqvist (born 1950), Swedish politician
Oscar Frithiof Nordqvist (1858–1925), Finnish hydrographer
Sven Nordqvist, Swedish writer and illustrator of children's books

See also 
 Norquist

Swedish-language surnames